The Manbarra, otherwise known as the Wulgurukaba, are Aboriginal Australian people, and the traditional custodians of the Palm Islands, Magnetic Island, and an area of mainland Queensland to the west of Townsville.

The Manbarra people were forcibly moved off the Palm Islands in the 1890s by the Queensland Government, and hundreds of people drawn from many Aboriginal nations on the mainland were moved to an Aboriginal reserve on Great Palm Island in 1914, becoming the Bwgcolman people, who inhabit the island today.

Name
The name "Wulgurukaba" translates to "canoe people".

Language

Wulguru/Manbarra was one of two Nyawaygic languages and constitutes the fourth class of the Herbert River languages, according to Robert M. W. Dixon. The surviving vocabulary of the Manbarra language, mainly collected by Ernest Gribble in 1932, indicates that it had a roughly 50% lexical overlap with Nyawaygi. Little information was conserved regarding its grammatical structure. Another language was also spoken on the island, Buluguyban which was mutually intelligible with Manbarra, and may have been a dialect name, like Mulgu, Wulgurukaba, Coonambella, and Nhawalgaba.

Country

History of contact
It is estimated that there were about 200 Manbarra people at the time of James Cook's visit in 1770. By the end of the 19th century they numbered about 50, apparently because many had left the island to go fishing for bêche-de-mer with Europeans. In 1909 the Queensland Chief Protector of Aborigines visited the island, apparently to check on the activities of Japanese pearling crews in the area, and reported the existence of a small camp of Aboriginal people. Most Manbarra people were forcibly removed to the mainland in the 1890s.

The last survivor of the Wulgurukaba band resident on Great Palm Island died in 1962.

Dreamtime mythology
The primordial creative serpent of the Manbarra dreamtime legends, a carpet snake named Gubbal, is said to have slithered down the Herbert River, and, swimming across the sea, to have disintegrated, leaving pieces of his back as Palm Island and his head as Magnetic Island.

Recent events
Tambo (Kukamunburra), a Manbarra man was shipped by the showman R. A. Cunningham to the United States in 1883, in response to a call by P.T. Barnum for specimens of "savage races" to be put into a display in his traveling circus act. He died the following year in Ohio. His mummified remains were first put on exhibition in a dime museum and then stored in the basement of a Cleveland funeral parlour and were only discovered a century later when the business closed down. The Manbarra community appealed for the repatriation of his remains and they were duly restored to the people in 1994. His reburial there according to traditional funeral rites that had fallen into abeyance for decades played an important role in the cultural renewal and reconsolidation of Manbarra identity, and also that of the Bwgaman.

Native title

In July 2012, a six hectare section of Magnetic Island was granted to the Wulgurukaba people under freehold native title. The Queensland government also stated it would grant trusteeship of a further  to the Wulgurukaba Yunbenun Aboriginal Corporation.

The Manbarra have not been given legal status as traditional owners of the Palm Islands, as the people known as the Bwgcolman, drawn from over 40 tribes on the mainland and Torres Strait Islands, were forcibly moved to the Palm Island Aboriginal Settlement from 1918 onwards, and it is their descendants (the "historical people", who now inhabit the island.

Alternative names
 Buruku'man, Burugu'man (native toponym for Great Palm Island)
 Korambelbara  (Warakamai exonym)
 Mun-ba-rah

Notes

Citations

Sources

Aboriginal peoples of Queensland
North Queensland